James Stock may refer to:

James H. Stock (born 1955), American economist
James Henry Stock (1855–1907), British Member of Parliament for Liverpool Walton